Racing Post is a British daily horse racing, greyhound racing and sports betting publisher which is published in print and digital formats. It is printed in tabloid format from Monday to Sunday. , it has an average daily circulation of 60,629 copies.

History 
Launched on 15 April 1986, the Racing Post is a daily national print and digital publisher specializing British horseracing industry and horse racing, greyhound racing and sports betting. The paper was founded by UAE (United Arab Emirates) Prime Minister and Sheikh of Dubai Sheikh Mohammed bin Rashid Al Maktoum, a racehorse owner, and edited by Graham Rock, who was replaced by Michael Harris in 1988. In 1998, Sheikh Mohammed sold the license for the paper to Trinity Mirror, owners of The Sporting Life, for £1; Sheikh Mohammed still retains ownership of the paper's name, and Trinity Mirror donated £10 million to four horseracing charities as a condition of the transfer.

In 2007, Trinity Mirror sold the paper for £170m to FL Partners, who appointed former editor Alan Byrne as editor-in-chief and chief executive. The paper launched its website, racingpost.co.uk, in 1997. After the paper's sale to FL Partners the site was relaunched as racingpost.com in 2008. The business was sold to Exponent Private Equity in September 2016, with Richard Segal being appointed chairman.

Alan Byrne edited the paper from 1993 to 2002. He was succeeded by Chris Smith, who was then replaced by Bruce Millington in 2007. Millington was editor between 2007 and 2018. In December 2018, Tom Kerr was named as the new editor of the Racing Post and Group Racing Director, replacing Bruce Millington. The former horserace writer of the year previously worked as a senior writer for Racing Post and had been with the business for nine years.

Racing Post employs approximately 300 permanent staff and expanded in 2018 by acquiring a majority stake in the leading sports betting website and app business, Apsley, as well as the acquisition of Leeds-based ICS Media Group, a content provider and digital marketing agency.

In March 2020 the Racing Post announced it would suspend publication of its print edition in response to the halting of British and Irish horseracing because of the coronavirus pandemic (COVID-19). Printing of the publication returned in June 2020.

Content and features
The Racing Post newspaper blends breaking news in the horseracing and betting industries with tipping content, race previews and reports, columns and features. In addition to daily editorials, the newspaper includes cards and form for each day's racing as well as entries and results. The greyhound section previews upcoming racing in addition to offering cards, form and results, and the sports section offers tipping across an extensive range of sports worldwide, as well as specials like politics or TV competitions and reality shows.

The mobile app (IOS and Android) includes cards, form, results and expert tips.

RacingPost.com features both free and premium (paid for) content. Sections include news, cards, results, tipping, bloodstock, sports, raceday live. statistics and shop. Race replays (access to a UK and Irish racing archive) and a digital newspaper are available to subscribers.

Accolades

Racing Post was highly commended for the Grand Prix award at the Newsawards 2016. The judges commented: "This was a tremendous example of adapting the business model in an increasingly online world. The Racing Post's multi-platform offering of print, app and pocket guides was evidence that the Racing Post had grabbed the digital revenue streams by the horns and made a huge success through diversifying. It has used its spin-off products and partnerships to extend its reach".

At the 2013 British Media Awards, the mobile app was named Digital Product of the Year and the iPad Daily Edition was named the Launch of the Year. At the 2013 Newspaper Awards, the iPad app was named Newspaper App of the Year, and the mobile app was named Digital Innovation of the Year.

Alastair Down won the specialist writer category at the Sports Journalists' Association (SJA) Awards in 2016. Edward Whitaker has won the SJA Sports Photographer of the Year on two occasions, in 2008 and 2011. Steve Palmer has won the SJA Sports Betting Writer of the Year on two occasions, in 2008 and 2009.

Edward Whitaker has also won Photographer of the Year at Horserace Writers and Photographers Association Derby Awards on a record-breaking eight occasions, while Alastair Down has taken home the Racing Writer of the Year award a record five times.

Lee Mottershead won Racing Writer of the Year in 2011, while Tom Kerr took the award in 2016.

A number of other Racing Post journalists have taken prizes at the Horserace Writers and Photographers Association Derby Awards, including Patrick McCann (Picture of the Year, 2015) and Bill Barber (Racing Reporter of the Year, 2018).

Specialist coverage

Weekender

The weekly betting newspaper is released every Wednesday. It is designed to look at the best bets for British and Irish racing for the week ahead, with a particular focus on the biggest betting races of the weekend. Regular tipsters/contributors include Tom Segal (Pricewise) and Paul Kealy.

RPSunday

The weekly feature is in every Sunday edition. It contains:
The Big Read – an exclusive in-depth interview with a key industry figure
Q+A with another notable individual
Story of the horse looks back over the careers of popular horses
On Location goes behind the scenes of various racecourses, stables and other racing-related places.
Sports Crossword featuring horse racing and general sport

Racing & Football Outlook

The weekly betting newspaper looks at the best bets for the action in both football and racing.

Racing Post TV

The audiovisual arm of the Racing Post provides a range of videos and Podcasts for racing fans. It has its own Twitter feed and a Racing Post YouTube channel which features tipsters and video forms.

Racing Post B2B

Racing Post B2B provides products and services to third parties in the UK, Ireland and internationally. The offering includes products for both digital and retail environments including horseracing, greyhound, football and other sports.

People
The publication's writers and columnists include:
 Willie Mullins
 Sam Twiston-Davies
 Tom Segal
Paul Kealy
 Lee Mottershead
 Bruce Millington
 Richard Hughes
 Richard Forristal
 Tom Kerr
 Julian Muscat
 Peter Thomas
Kevin Pullein
Alastair Down
SEO Team include:
Svetoslav Petkov
 Sam Nixon
 Syed Shehzad

Chief Marketing Officer (CTO)
 Gethin Evans

References

External links 
 Racing Post
 Racing Post Pictures
 Soccerbase
 Racing Post B2B

Sports newspapers published in the United Kingdom
Horse racing mass media in the United Kingdom